Tok Junction Airport  is a state-owned public-use airport located one nautical mile (2 km) east of the central business district of Tok, in the Southeast Fairbanks Census Area of the U.S. state of Alaska.

This airport is included in the FAA's National Plan of Integrated Airport Systems for 2011–2015 which categorized it as a general aviation facility.

Facilities and aircraft 
Tok Junction Airport has one runway designated 07/25 with an asphalt surface measuring 2,509 by 50 feet (765 x 15 m).

For the 12-month period ending December 31, 2005, the airport had 2,700 aircraft operations, an average of 225 per month: 56% air taxi and 44% general aviation. At that time there were 39 aircraft based at this airport: 90% single-engine, 8% multi-engine and 3% helicopter.

Airline and destinations 

The following airline offers scheduled passenger service at this airport:

Other airports in Tok 
It has one runway designated 13/31 with a 1,690 by 45 ft (515 x 14 m) gravel and turf surface.

It has one runway designated 10/28 with a 2,035 x 80 ft (620 x 24 m) gravel surface.

References

External links 

 FAA Alaska airport diagram (GIF)
 

Airports in the Southeast Fairbanks Census Area, Alaska